Resist is the debut album by English electronic music group Kosheen. The album was first released on 25 June 2001 in the Benelux countries as a limited edition by Moksha Records. The UK edition was then released on September 17 as a sixteen-track record by Sony BMG. The Japanese edition, released in 2003, was a double-CD set containing fifteen B-sides and remixes, plus the exclusive track "Tell Me".

The BBC used the song "Catch" in trailers for Series 1 of 24. "Hide U" and "Pride" were both featured in the soundtrack for FIFA Football 2003.

Track listings
All songs written by Sian Evans, Darren Beale, Mark Morrison 11 & 15 extra writers Jon Hall & Rod Bowkett

Charts

Weekly charts

Year-end charts

References

2001 debut albums
Kosheen albums